HMS Comet was one of thirty-two  destroyers built for the Royal Navy during the Second World War, a member of the eight-ship Co sub-class.

Design and description
The Co sub-class was a repeat of the preceding Ch sub-class.

The ships were powered by a pair of geared steam turbines, each driving one propeller shaft using steam provided by two Admiralty three-drum boilers. The ships' complement was 186 officers and ratings.

The main armament of the destroyers consisted of four QF  Mk IV dual-purpose guns, one superfiring pair each fore and aft of the superstructure protected by partial gun shields. Their anti-aircraft suite consisted of one twin-gun stabilised Mk IV "Hazemeyer" mount for  Bofors guns and two single 2-pounder (40 mm) AA guns amidships, and single mounts for a  Oerlikon AA gun on the bridge wings. The ships were fitted with one quadruple mount for 21-inch (533 mm) torpedo tubes. The ships were equipped with a pair of depth charge rails and two throwers for 35 depth charges.

Construction and career
Comet was ordered from Yarrow on 12 September 1942 and the ship was laid down on 14 June 1943 at its shipyard in Scotstoun, launched on 22 June 1944 and was commissioned on 6 June 1945.

On commissioning Comet worked up at Scapa Flow, before carrying out occupation duties at Wilhelmshaven in Germany in August and October 1945, before leaving for the Far East for service with the British Pacific Fleet, arriving at Kure, Japan in February 1946. She served as part of the 8th Destroyer Flotilla (later the 8th Destroyer Squadron) during her time in the Far East. She returned to the UK for a refit in 1948. She was given an interim modernization and was fitted for minelaying. The ship then served as part of the 6th Destroyer Squadron in the Home Fleet between 1953 and 1957. Comet was paid off in February 1958. Following her sale she arrived at the breakers yard for scrapping at Troon on 23 October 1962.

References

Bibliography
 
 
 
 
 
 
 
 

 

Cold War destroyers of the United Kingdom
1944 ships
Ships built on the River Clyde
C-class destroyers (1943) of the Royal Navy